Count Jan Mikołaj Chodkiewicz (14 December 1738, Gdańsk - 2 February 1781, Chernobyl) was the Starost of Żmudź and Wielona; Count of Szkłów and .

Biography
His father, was the Voivode of Brest-Litovsk. In 1757, after completing his studies at Vilnius University, he was appointed a Colonel to His Majesty. From 1758 to 1759, he fought in the Seven Years' War on the side of France.

In 1764, he became a Colonel and Counselor in the new Polish–Lithuanian Commonwealth. He was also elected to the Convocation Sejm, representing the Księstwo żmudzkie, and was an Elector for Stanisław August Poniatowski. That same year, his troops raided the Radziwiłł palace complex in Biała Podlaska. His actions led to his being named a general officer in the Order of Saint Stanislaus.

In 1766, he was appointed a Senator At-large. That same year, he married Maria Ludwika Rzewuska (1744-1816), daughter of the poet and Hetman, Wacław Rzewuski. They had four sons and two daughters, including Aleksander Chodkiewicz, a noted Polish patriot, and Rozalia Lubomirska, whose execution in France created an international incident.

During the Bar Confederation, he avoided making any firm commitments. While lamenting the sorry state of his oppressed country, he supported the Prussian and Russian commanders who were protecting his personal properties. Nevertheless, in 1774, he was awarded the Order of the White Eagle. In 1778, he was made a Lieutenant-General in the Russian Army, but resigned after only a short time.

References

Further reading 
Władysław Konopczyński, "Chodkiewicz Jan Mikołaj". in: Polski Słownik Biograficzny, Vol.3, Polska Akademia Umiejętności, 1937. Reprinted in 1989 by Zakład Narodowy im. Ossolińskich, Kraków 

1738 births
1781 deaths
18th-century Polish nobility
Polish senators
Polish military officers
Politicians from Gdańsk
18th-century Polish–Lithuanian military personnel